Events from the year 1717 in Russia

Incumbents
 Monarch – Peter I

Events

 College of War
 Collegium of Accounting
 Collegium of Commerce
 Collegium of Foreign Affairs
 Collegium of Justice
 Collegium of Mining and Manufacturing
 Collegium of State Expenses
 Collegium of State Income
 Russo–Khivan War of 1717

Births

November 14 - Alexander Sumarokov, poet, play write (died 1777)

Deaths

 (N/A) - Alexander Bekovich-Cherkassky, commander (born N/A)

References

 
Years of the 18th century in Russia